Surveillance is a 1997 Chinese comedy film directed by Huang Jianxin. It was entered into the 47th Berlin International Film Festival.

Cast
 Gong Feng as Ye Minzhu
 Shan Jiang as Bai Lin
 Rujun Ten as Tian Gongshun (as Rujun Teng)
 Xiaotong Zhang as Yang Gao

References

External links

1997 films
1997 comedy films
1990s Mandarin-language films
Films directed by Huang Jianxin
Chinese comedy films